Mrs. Silence Dogood was the pen name used by Benjamin Franklin to get his work published in the New-England Courant, a newspaper founded and published by his brother James Franklin. This was after Benjamin Franklin was denied several times when he tried to publish letters under his own name in the Courant.  The 14 Mrs. Silence Dogood letters were first printed in 1722.

History
As a young boy, Franklin worked as an apprentice in his older brother's printing shop in Boston, where The New-England Courant was published and printed.

Franklin never got anything he wrote published, so, at age 16, he created the persona of a middle-aged widow named Silence Dogood.  Once every two weeks, he would leave a letter under the door of his brother's printing shop.  A total of 14 letters were sent.  The first letter began:

The letters poked fun at various aspects of life in colonial America, such as this quote about hoop petticoats:

The letters were published in The New-England Courant fortnightly, and amused readers.  Some men wrote in offering to marry Ms. Dogood, upon learning she was widowed.

Eventually, James found out that all fourteen of the letters had been written by his younger brother, which angered him. Benjamin left his apprenticeship without permission and escaped to Philadelphia.

Letters 1 & 2 – Dogood's background 
Franklin created a whole background for his character, and explained this in depth in the majority of his first letter:

The whole second letter was an account of Dogood's life:

In popular culture 
The Silence Dogood letters feature in the 2004 movie National Treasure. After stealing the United States Declaration of Independence, cryptologist Benjamin Franklin Gates (Nicolas Cage), Riley Poole (Justin Bartha), and Dr. Abigail Chase (Diane Kruger) find an Ottendorf cipher hidden in invisible ink on the back of the Declaration. Following the discovery of a Knights Templar riddle, which said "The key in Silence undetected", a link between the Silence Dogood letters and the cipher is established. The cipher is used to find the hidden message in the letters, which proves to be another clue. With the help of a fellow museum visitor (Yves Michael-Beneche), Riley gains the letters of the cipher needed to complete the puzzle while remaining undetected by their enemies, led by Ian Howe (Sean Bean).

References

External links 

The Papers of Benjamin Franklin, online archive which includes the Dogood letters BROKEN LINK

Letters (message)
Benjamin Franklin
Works by Benjamin Franklin
18th-century pseudonymous writers